Skogstorp may refer to:

Skogstorp, Eskilstuna Municipality, a locality in Eskilstuna Municipality, Sweden
Skogstorp, Falkenberg Municipality, a locality in Falkenberg Municipality, Sweden